Sartorite is a lead arsenic sulfide with the chemical formula PbAs2S4 and as type locality the Lengenbach Quarry in Legenbach, Binnental, Valais, Switzerland. Historically, sartorite has been thought isomorphic to chalcostibite, emplectite, and zinckenite, but was definitively distinguished from the others in 1939.

Etymology 
The mineral is named after its discoverer, Sartorius von Walterhausen (1809-1876).

Occurrences 
The mineral is predominantly found in hydrothermal deposits in dolomite. Sometimes the mineral is containing traces of thallium and has been reported from:

 Argentina
 Jujuy Province
 Rinconada Department
 Rinconada
 Cerro Redondo prospect
 Austria 
 Tyrol
 North Tyrol
 Inn valley
 Innsbruck
 Hall
 Hall valley
 Salt mine
 Azerbaijan
 Balakan District
 Belokan-Avar ore district
 Filizchai deposit
 China
 Hunan
 Huaihua
 Huitong Co.
 Mobin Au deposit (Unconfirmed)
 Hungary
 Pest County
 Szob District
 Nagybörzsöny
 Italy
 Tuscany
 Lucca Province
 Seravezza
 Seravezza quarrying basin
 Japan
 Hokkaidō
 Abuta District
 Takarada
 Tohya mine (Toya mine; Tohya-Takarada mine) ?
 Spain
 Andalusia
 Granada
 Baza
 Sierra de Baza
 Calar de San José
 Switzerland
 Valais
 Binn Valley
 Binn
 Reckibach
 Lengenbach Quarry (TL)
 Messerbach (Mässerbach)
 United States
 Colorado
 San Juan Co.
 Red Mountain Mining District
 Anvil Mountain
 Zuñi mine
 New York
 St. Lawrence Co.
 Fowler
 Sylvia Lake
 Balmat mine

See also 

 List of minerals
 baumhauerite
 gratonite
 guettardite
 seligmannite

References

Further reading 

 Kharbish, S. (2016) Micro‐Raman spectroscopic investigations of extremely scarce Pb–As sulfosalt minerals: baumhauerite, dufrénoysite, gratonite, sartorite, and seligmannite. Journal of Raman Spectroscopy 47, 1360-1366
 Cannon, R., Hensel, H. & Raber, T. (2008): Der Reckibach-Dolomit im Binntal, Schweiz: Mineralbestand und Neufunde. Lapis, 33 (3), 20–28; 50. (in German); Lapis No. 3, March
 Rocks & Minerals 71:2 pp. 94–101, New York
 U.S. Geological Survey, 2005, Mineral Resources Data System: U.S. Geological Survey, Reston, Virginia
 Berlepsch, P., Armbruster, T., Makovicky, E., Topa, D. (2003) Another step toward understanding the true nature of sartorite: Determination and refinement of a ninefold superstructure. Am. Mineral. 88, 450–461. [= enneasartorite]
 Stalder, H. A., Wagner, A., Graeser, S. and Stuker, P. (1998): "Mineralienlexikon der Schweiz", Wepf (Basel), p. 361
 Shimizu & Matsuyama (1997) Ganko-Gakkai Kou'en-Youshi, 160
 Pring, A. (1995) Structural modulation in sartorite: An electron microscopy study. Am. Mineral. 78, 619–626.
 Sureda, R.J., Brito, J.R. (1992) Sartorita, PbAs2S4, en el prospecto polimetalico cerro Redondo, Jujuy, Argentina. 1 Reunion de Mineralogia y Metalogenia. Instituto de Recursos Minerales. UNLP Publicacion 2:307-318.; Milka K. de Brodtkorb (2002) Las Especies Minerales de la Republica Argentina. Vol. 1 (elements, sulphides and sulphosalts). (Asociacion Mineralogica Argentina)
 Dezhong Zhou, Dayuan Ye, and Dalong Yu (1989): Mineral Deposits 8(1), 51-64
 Torres-Ruis, J., Velilla, N., Vivaldi, M., Manuel, J., Delgado Salazar, F., & Fenoll Hach-Ali, P. (1985). The fluorite-(Ba-Pb-Zn) deposits of the" Sierra de Baza"(Betic Cordillera, South-East Spain). Bulletin de minéralogie, 108(3), 421-436
 Koch: Minerals of Hungary, 1985
 Canadian Mineralogist (1980) 18:13-15; Orlandi, P. & Criscuolo, A. (2009). Minerali del marmo delle Alpi Apuane. Pacini editore, Pisa, 180 pp.
 Iitaka, Y. & Nowacki, W. (1961) A refinement of the pseudo crystal structure of scleroclase PbAs2S4. Acta Crystallographica 14, 1291-1292
 Palache, Charles, Harry Berman & Clifford Frondel (1944) The System of Mineralogy of James Dwight Dana and Edward Salisbury Dana Yale University 1837–1892, Volume I: Elements, Sulfides, Sulfosalts, Oxides. John Wiley and Sons, Inc., New York. 7th edition, revised and enlarged: 478-481
 Smith, G.F.H. and Solly, R.H. (1919) On sartorite and the problem of its crystal-form. Mineral. Mag., 18, 259-316

Sulfides
Sulfosalt minerals
Arsenic minerals
Lead minerals
Monoclinic minerals
Minerals in space group 14